was a district located in Shiga Prefecture, Japan.

As of 2003, the district had an estimated population of 41,048 and a density of 179.51 persons per km2. The total area was 228.67 km2.

Towns and villages
 Eigenji
 Gokashō
 Notogawa

Mergers
 On February 11, 2005 - the towns of Eigenji and Gokashō, along with the towns of Aitō and Kotō (both from Echi District), and the city of Yōkaichi, were merged to create the city of Higashiōmi.
 On January 1, 2006 - the town of Notogawa, along with the town of Gamō (from Gamō District), was merged into the expanded city of Higashiōmi. Kanzaki District was dissolved as a result of this merger.

Transition
Light blue autonomies are Kanzaki District's town, deep blue autonomies are Kanzaki District's village, and gray autonomies are others.

Former districts of Shiga Prefecture